Bayer-Hochhaus was a 32-storey,  skyscraper in Leverkusen, Germany. When completed in 1963, it was the tallest building in Germany for nine years until 1972 when City-Hochhaus Leipzig was built. It was demolished in 2012.

See also
 List of tallest voluntarily demolished buildings

References

External links
 Bayer-Hochhaus in Leverkusen-guide

Commercial buildings completed in 1963
Buildings and structures in Leverkusen
International Style (architecture)
Modernist architecture in Germany
Skyscraper office buildings in Germany
2012 disestablishments in Germany
Buildings and structures demolished in 2012
Demolished buildings and structures in Germany
Former skyscrapers